The 1978–79 Cleveland Cavaliers season was the ninth season of the franchise in the National Basketball Association (NBA).

Season standings 

Notes
 z, y – division champions
 x – clinched playoff spot

Record vs. opponents

Game log

|-style="background:#cfc;"
| 21 || November 28, 1978 || Atlanta
| W 112–98
|
|
|
| Coliseum at Richfield4,130
| 7–14

|-style="background:#fcc;
| 33 || December 23, 1978 || @ Atlanta
| L 91–109
|
|
|
| The Omni6,215
| 12–21

|-style="background:#fcc;
| 59 || February 20, 1979 || Atlanta
| L 109–119
|
|
|
| Coliseum at Richfield6,523
| 24–35

|-style="background:#fcc;
| 72 || March 20, 1979 || @ Atlanta
| L 109–115
|
|
|
| The Omni6,384
| 28–44

References

Cleveland Cavaliers seasons
Cleveland
1978 in sports in Ohio
Cleveland